The City of Melbourne is a local government area in Victoria, Australia, located in the central city area of Melbourne. The city's motto is "Vires acquirit eundo" which means "She gathers strength as she goes."

The current Lord Mayor is Sally Capp, who was elected in a by-election following the resignation of Robert Doyle on 4 February 2018. The Melbourne City Council (MCC) holds office in Melbourne Town Hall.

History 
Melbourne was founded in 1835, during the reign of King William IV, with the arrival of the schooner Enterprize near the present site of the Queen's Wharf, as a barely legal, speculative settlement that broke away from New South Wales. Unlike other Australian capital cities, Melbourne did not originate under official auspices, instead forming through the foresight of settlers from Tasmania.

Having been a province of New South Wales from its establishment in 1835, affairs of the settlement had been administered by the Parliament of New South Wales. With the growth of the settlement there had been an increasing demand by the inhabitants for greater autonomy over their own affairs. On 12 August 1842, Melbourne was incorporated as a "town" by Act 6 Victoria No. 7 of the Governor and Legislative Council of New South Wales.

The town of Melbourne was raised to the status of a city by Letters Patent of Queen Victoria dated 25 June 1847, five years after its incorporation as a town. The Letters Patent also constituted the Anglican Diocese of Melbourne and declared Melbourne a cathedral city. A motion was tabled at a meeting of the Town Council to alter the style and title of Melbourne from a town to a city, a draft Bill was approved and transmitted to the Government for introduction to the Legislature. On 3 August 1849, Act 13 Victoria No. 14 was finally assented to as "An Act to effect a change in the Style and Title of the Corporation of Melbourne rendered necessary by the erection of the Town of Melbourne to a City".

The city's initial boundaries, as set down in Act 8 Victoria No. 12 (19 December 1844) extended from Point Ormond in Elwood up Barkly Street and Punt Road to the Yarra River, along the river to Merri Creek at Abbotsford, then west along Brunswick Road to Moonee Ponds Creek, then south past Flemington Bridge to Princes Pier in Port Melbourne. The Act imposed on the Mayor a duty to set up "permanent and conspicuous boundary marks of iron, wood, stone or other durable material" along or near the line of the Town’s boundaries—this was undertaken by Mayor James Frederick Palmer and Town Clerk John Charles King on 4 February 1846.

During the 1850s, Collingwood, Fitzroy and Richmond seceded from Melbourne (all are, since 1994, part of the City of Yarra), as did South Melbourne, whilst other parts became parts of the neighbouring districts of St Kilda and Port Melbourne, and the border between Brunswick and Melbourne moved south one block to Park Street.

On 18 December 1902, King Edward VII conferred the title "Lord Mayor" on the mayor of the City of Melbourne.

On 30 October 1905, Melbourne absorbed two neighbouring council areas. Now included in the City was the Borough of Flemington and Kensington, which had been formed in 1882 when it broke away from the City of Essendon. The second, the Town of North Melbourne, formerly known as Hotham, had been established on 30 September 1859 and been granted town status on 18 December 1874. Both town halls are still in use today as public buildings—the former in Kensington near the present-day Newmarket railway station; the latter in Errol Street, North Melbourne.

The Melbourne and Geelong Corporations Act 1938 allowed for three councillors for each of the eleven wards, with a general election held on 24 August 1939. Following a recommendation by the Local Government Advisory Board in 1978, an Order in Council (27 February 1979, effective from 19 May 1979) reduced this to eight wards.  In December 1980, the Hamer Government dismissed the council, and appointed three Commissioners to determine how the boundaries could best be altered to produce more effective local government, with special regard to Melbourne's central business district and its importance to the state, as well as to advise changes needed to the constitution, structure, functions and administration. However, in 1982, with the election of a new Labor government under John Cain, the Act establishing the commission was repealed, and the Melbourne Corporation (Election of Council) Act 1982 established six wards, for which an election was held on 4 December 1982. Three years later, an additional ward was added.

Between 1993 and 1996 the City was again led by Commissioners, along with every local Council in Victoria, while all boundaries were comprehensively reviewed, more than halving the number of Councils.  

In 1993, the City of Melbourne Act specified changes to the boundaries which saw Melbourne gain Southbank and the Victorian Arts Centre on 18 November 1993, and the city was resubdivided into four wards – Flagstaff, University, Hoddle and Domain. The wards were abolished in 2001, with the council having a directly elected Lord Mayor and Deputy Lord Mayor, and seven other councillors. In 2012, the number of Councillors was increased to nine, in addition to the Lord Mayor and Deputy Lord Mayor.

Also in the 1990s, local government control of the docks area on the west side of the city was given to Victorian Government's Docklands Authority.

In 2005, the council announced the construction of a new 6-star environmental office building, Council House 2, in Little Collins Street.

On 2 July 2007, the City of Melbourne almost doubled in size when the suburb of Docklands was re-added to its jurisdiction.

On 1 July 2008, a section of Kensington and North Melbourne was transferred to the City of Melbourne from the City of Moonee Valley.

In July 2009, Lord Mayor Robert Doyle unveiled a new corporate identity for the City of Melbourne, costing $239,558.

Building on the council's longstanding interest in environmental issues, on 16 July 2019, the council voted to declare a climate and biodiversity emergency in line with similar declarations made elsewhere.

Following the death of Her Majesty Queen Elizabeth II, the City of Melbourne caused controversy and breached protocol, by failing to lower the Aboriginal and Torres Strait Islander flags to half mast, whilst the Australian flag was lowered in mourning.

Composition of current Council

The City of Melbourne is an unsubdivided municipality consisting of a directly elected Lord Mayor and Deputy Lord Mayor, and nine Councillors. Since 2008, all Victorian councillors serve a four-year term. The most recent general election was held on Saturday 24 October 2020. The next general election will be held in October 2024.

During a general election, the City of Melbourne holds two simultaneous elections – one to elect the Lord Mayor and Deputy Lord Mayor (leadership team) and the other to elect the nine councillors. All residents are entitled to vote in the election, as well as up to two of each of the following: non-residential owners and occupiers of rateable property. If a corporation solely owns or occupies rateable property in the municipality, then the corporation must appoint two company officers (director and/or company secretary, or equivalent) to represent it and vote on its behalf.

The current makeup of the Council is:

Demographics

Townships and localities
The 2021 census, the city had a population of 149,615 up from 135,959 in the 2016 census

^ - Territory divided with another LGA

Population of the urban area 

* Estimates in 1958, 1983 and 1988 Victorian Year Books.

Railway stations

Schools

Public 
 University High School
South Yarra Primary School
Carlton Gardens Primary School

Private 
 Eltham College – Year 9 City Campus
 Melbourne Grammar School
 Melbourne Girls' Grammar School 
 Wesley College – St Kilda Road Campuses
 Haileybury College - City Campus

 Tintern Grammar

Catholic 
 St Aloysius' College
 St Joseph's College
 Simonds Catholic College

Sister cities 

The City of Melbourne has five currently active sister cities relationships. They are:

 Osaka, Japan (1978)
 Tianjin,  China (1980)
 Thessaloniki,  Greece (1984)
 Boston, Massachusetts, United States (1985)
 Milan,  Italy (2004)

Between 1989 and 2022 Melbourne had a sister city relationship with Saint Petersburg; this sister city relationship has been indefinitely suspended since 1 March 2022, as a result of Russia's large-scale invasion of Ukraine on 24 February 2022.

Some other local councils in the Melbourne metropolitan area have sister city relationships; see Local Government Areas of Victoria.

See also 
 2008 City of Melbourne election
 List of mayors and lord mayors of Melbourne

References

External links 

Official City of Melbourne website
What's On
Metlink local public transport map
Local history of the city of Melbourne
Enterprize – Melbourne's Tall Ship
Link to Land Victoria interactive maps

Local government areas of Melbourne
Greater Melbourne (region)
 
1842 establishments in Australia